Pak Sung-hyok (born 30 May 1990) is a North Korean international football player. He plays for Sobaeksu in the DPR Korea League.

He has played on three occasions for the North Korean national team. He was named to the 23-man North Korean squad for the 2010 FIFA World Cup.

References

External links

Pak Sung-hyok at DPRKFootball

1990 births
Living people
North Korean footballers
Association football midfielders
North Korea international footballers
2010 FIFA World Cup players